In enzymology, an UTP-monosaccharide-1-phosphate uridylyltransferase is an enzyme that catalyzes the chemical reaction

UTP + a monosaccharide 1-phosphate  diphosphate + UDP-monosaccharide

Thus, the two substrates of this enzyme are UTP and monosaccharide 1-phosphate, whereas its two products are diphosphate and UDP-monosaccharide.

This enzyme belongs to the family of transferases, specifically those transferring phosphorus-containing nucleotide groups (nucleotidyltransferases).  The systematic name of this enzyme class is '''. Other names in common use include UDP-sugar pyrophosphorylase, and PsUSP'''.

References

 
 

EC 2.7.7
Enzymes of unknown structure